Moe's or Moes may refer to:

Moes (surname), includes a list of people with the name Moes
Mões,  civil parish in the municipality of Castro Daire, Portugal
Moe's Southwest Grill, an American fast casual restaurant franchise
Moe's Tavern, fictional bar in The Simpsons
Moe's (bar and lounge), bar in Fort Greene, Brooklyn, New York City that closed in 2011

See also
Mo's Restaurants, American restaurant chain in Oregon